The Labourers and Farmers Party (Rōdōsha Nōmintō) was a political party in Japan. It was active from 1948 until 1957.

History
The party was established in December 1948 by members of the Socialist Party Orthodox Faction Diet Members' Group, which was formed by 16 National Diet members who had resigned or been expelled from the Japan Socialist Party after voting against the budget proposed by the Democratic Party–Socialist government due to their opposition to an increase in public transport fares. It was particularly well-supported in Okayama and Hokkaido where party president Hisao Kuroda and Haruo Okada were based, and was supported by some members of the National Railwaymen's Union and National Communications Workers' Union.

It won only seven seats in the January 1949 elections, and was further reduced in size by three defections over the party's unclear stance on the Korean War. It won two seats in the 1950 House of Councillors elections, and retained its four remaining seats in the House of Representatives in the 1952 general elections.

In the 1953 elections it won five seats in the House of Representatives, but failed to win a seats in the simultaneous House of Councillors elections. The 1955 elections saw the party reduced to three Diet members and lost its representation in the House of Councillors in the 1956 elections.

The party was dissolved in January 1957 when its 2,000 members joined the Socialist Party.

References

Defunct political parties in Japan
Political parties established in 1948
1948 establishments in Japan
Political parties disestablished in 1957
1957 disestablishments in Japan